Peschke is a surname. Notable people with the surname include:

 Adolph Peschke (1914–2012), American outdoorsman
 Heiko Peschke (born 1963), German footballer
 Květa Peschke (born 1975), Czech tennis player